Navarre is an autonomous community of Spain.

Navarre may also mean:

Places 
 Lower Navarre, historical region of southern France
 Kingdom of Navarre, historical state of Western Europe
 Nueva Navarra, one of the provinces in New Spain.

Australia
 Navarre, Victoria

United States
 Navarre, Florida
 Navarre, Kansas
 Navarre, New Orleans, Louisiana, a neighborhood
 Navarre, Ohio

People 
 Henri Navarre (1898–1983), French general best known for his defeat at the Battle of Dien Bien Phu
 Jean Navarre (1895–1919), French aviator during World War I
 Marguerite de Navarre (1492–1549), queen consort of King Henry II of Navarre
 Peter Navarre (1785–1874), early settler in the Maumee River valley
 Yves Navarre (1940–1994), French writer

Other uses 
 Navarre (restaurant), a restaurant in Portland, Oregon, U.S.
 Navarre Corporation, a publishing/distribution company
 Collège de Navarre, a historical college in Paris

Navarra 
Navarra may also mean:
 Navarra (DO), Spanish quality wine-producing region
 Navarra (Spanish Congress Electoral District)
 The Spanish Navy cruiser Navarra, vessel of the late 19th century
 Navarra (F85), frigate in the Spanish Navy
 André Navarra (1911–1988), French cellist
 Michele Navarra (1905–1958), Italian Sicilian mafia boss
 Nissan Navara